Ingå is a municipality of Finland.

The municipality is bilingual, with majority being Swedish and minority Finnish speakers.

Finnish national road 51 goes right through the southern part of Ingå. The centre consists mainly of the road Bollstavägen that cuts through the Ingå centrum. Along the road are most of the major buildings and shops of the small municipality. A few grocery stores, small kiosk, library and a bar. Towards the Road 51 there is the residential area. Near road 51, at the northern tip of the residential area is the Ingå Volunteer Rescue Company. Nearby villages include Kusans.

Politics
Results of the 2011 Finnish parliamentary election in Ingå:

Swedish People's Party   41.5%
National Coalition Party   20.3%
Social Democratic Party   16.8%
Finns Party   9.0%
Green League   5.4%
Left Alliance   2.4%
Centre Party   1.8%
Christian Democrats   1.5%

See also
 Karis
 Siuntio

References

External links

Municipality of Ingå – Official website
The Cannons at Torp Museum

 
Populated coastal places in Finland
Populated places established in the 1330s
Port cities and towns in Finland